Girouard may refer to:

People
Antoine Girouard (politician) (1836–1904), Canadian political figure
Audrey Girouard, Canadian computer scientist and professor
Lady Blanche Girouard, Irish writer
Désiré Girouard (1836–1911), Canadian lawyer, politician, and Puisne Justice of the Supreme Court of Canada
Gérard Girouard (born 1933) Canadian lawyer, professor and politician
Gilbert Anselme Girouard (1846–1885), Canadian general merchant and political figure
Jean-Joseph Girouard (1794–1855), Canadian notary and political figure
Joseph-Éna Girouard (1855–1937), Canandian notary, lawyer and political figure
Mark Girouard (1931–2022), British architectural writer and historian
Marvin Girouard, American businessman
Paul J. Girouard (1898–1964) American-born Catholic bishop in Madagascar
Percy Girouard (1867–1932), Canadian railway builder and colonial governor
Wilfrid Girouard (1891–1980), Canadian lawyer, judge and political figure
Yvette Girouard, American softball coach

Places
Le Girouard, a commune in the Vendée department in Western France
Mount Girouard, the highest peak of the Fairholme Range in Banff National Park, Canada
Girouard Lake, on the Mégiscane River, in Senneterre, Quebec, Canada

See also
Girouard v. United States, a case decided by the Supreme Court of the United States 
Collège Antoine-Girouard, a high school in Quebec